Fantastic Beasts: The Secrets of Dumbledore is a 2022 fantasy film directed by David Yates from a screenplay by J. K. Rowling and Steve Kloves, based on a screenplay by Rowling. The sequel to Fantastic Beasts: The Crimes of Grindelwald (2018), it is the third instalment in the  Fantastic Beasts film series and the eleventh overall in the Wizarding World franchise. The film features an ensemble cast that includes Eddie Redmayne, Jude Law, Ezra Miller, Dan Fogler, Alison Sudol, Callum Turner, Jessica Williams, Katherine Waterston, and Mads Mikkelsen. Set several years after the events of its predecessor, the film sees Albus Dumbledore tasking Newt Scamander and his allies with a mission that takes them into the heart of dark wizard Gellert Grindelwald's army.

The third Fantastic Beasts film was slated for release in November 2020, before it was pushed back to July 2022 due to the COVID-19 pandemic. Much of the main cast from the first two films confirmed their involvement in March 2020. Principal photography was set to begin in early 2020, but was postponed due to the pandemic, eventually commencing in September 2020. Johnny Depp, who portrayed Grindelwald in previous films, was originally set to return and filmed one scene for the film, but was asked to resign in November 2020 following the verdict of the Depp v News Group Newspapers Ltd court case; Mads Mikkelsen replaced him later that month. Filming took place until February 2021.

The Secrets of Dumbledore premiered at the Royal Festival Hall in London on 29 March 2022, and was released in the United Kingdom on 8 April 2022 and in the United States on 15 April in 2D, 4D, Dolby Cinema, IMAX, and ScreenX formats, by Warner Bros. Pictures. The film received mixed reviews from critics, though it was generally considered an improvement over its predecessor. It grossed over $407 million worldwide, making it the lowest-grossing film in the Wizarding World franchise.

Plot
Albus Dumbledore and Gellert Grindelwald briefly meet in a Muggle teashop where they acknowledge their mutual feelings. Grindelwald vows to destroy the Muggle world, but Dumbledore denounces the plan as madness, saying he once supported it only because he was young and foolish.

In Kweilin, China, 1932, Newt Scamander helps a Qilin — a magical creature that can see into one's soul as well as the future — give birth. Grindelwald's acolytes, led by Credence, attack and kill the mother, then kidnap the newborn. Grindelwald kills the creature, intending to harness its ability of precognition. Unbeknownst to them, the Qilin had twins, the younger of which Newt saved.

Unable to battle Grindelwald due to a blood pact they formed, Albus Dumbledore recruits Newt, Newt's brother Theseus, Ilvermorny Charms teacher Lally Hicks, Senegalese-French wizard Yusuf Kama, American No-Maj Jacob Kowalski, and Newt's assistant Bunty to thwart Grindelwald's plan for world domination. They travel to Berlin, where Yusuf is planted as a spy in Grindelwald's inner circle. Grindelwald has convert Queenie Goldstein use legilimency to test Yusuf's trustworthiness. The International Confederation of Wizards (ICW) acquits Grindelwald of all previous criminal charges, allowing him to run in the elections for Supreme Leader of the ICW, despite Dumbledore's attempts to otherwise persuade current Leader Anton Vogel.

Meanwhile, Grindelwald's acolytes, who have undermined the German Ministry of Magic, arrest Theseus and plot to assassinate the Brazilian candidate, Vicência Santos. Dumbledore dispatches Newt to the Erkstag, the secret German wizarding prison where Theseus is held. Lally and Jacob escape after successfully preventing the assassination, but Jacob is framed for attempting to murder Grindelwald, who then justifies suppressing all Muggles. Meanwhile, Credence battles Albus Dumbledore, who quickly defeats him. Credence learns he is the illegitimate son of Aberforth Dumbledore, Albus Dumbledore's brother, and questions his loyalty to Grindelwald. Elsewhere, Newt and Theseus escape the Erkstag and use a Portkey to transport to Hogwarts.

Wizarding world leaders gather in Bhutan for the Walk of the Qilin ritual, at which a Qilin will select a worthy new Supreme Leader. Using necromancy, Grindelwald reanimates the dead Qilin and, knowing Dumbledore and Newt will bring the surviving twin Qilin to the ritual, gives Credence a last chance to redeem himself. To thwart Grindelwald's cohorts, each Dumbledore ally carries an identical suitcase with only one containing the Qilin.

The team arrive in Bhutan and are immediately confronted by Grindelwald's acolytes. Queenie renounces Grindelwald and reunites with Jacob, but they are caught. The manipulated dead Qilin chooses Grindelwald during the Supreme Leader selection ceremony. He immediately declares war on all Muggles and tortures Jacob with the cruciatus curse until Santos intervenes. Credence, Newt, and Bunty expose Grindelwald. Bunty, who has the real suitcase, produces the surviving Qilin, which passes by Grindelwald and Vogel and bows to Dumbledore. Shocked, Dumbledore thanks the Qilin for the honor but convinces it that there is another equally worthy. The Qilin goes on to bow to Santos, who is chosen as the new Supreme Leader. Enraged, Grindelwald tries to kill Credence who is simultaneously protected by Aberforth and Albus. Dumbledore's and Grindelwald's clashing spells break the blood pact. Their ensuing battle reaches a stalemate, and Grindelwald disapparates.

In the aftermath, Aberforth accepts the ailing Credence as his son and takes him home. Jacob and Queenie marry at Jacob's bakery, with most of the team and Tina Goldstein in attendance. Newt spots Dumbledore watching from across the street. Dumbledore thanks Newt before disappearing into the night.

Cast

Eddie Redmayne as Newt Scamander:A British Ministry of Magic employee in the Beasts Division of the Department for the Regulation and Control of Magical Creatures, as well as a self-proclaimed magizoologist. He played a part in remedying the events of a violent attack in New York City in December 1926 involving dark wizard Gellert Grindelwald. He is a confidant of Albus Dumbledore, despite being an outcast from certain circles of the British Wizarding Community due to his checkered past.
Jude Law as Albus Dumbledore:An extremely powerful and influential wizard in the British Wizarding Community, known in the British Ministry of Magic and throughout the wider wizarding world for his academic brilliance, and teacher of Defence Against the Dark Arts at Hogwarts School of Witchcraft and Wizardry. He holds a blood pact with Grindelwald, with whom he was in love and had a close relationship as a young adult, preventing them from duelling each other.
Ezra Miller as Credence Barebone / Aurelius Dumbledore:The disturbed adopted child of Mary-Lou Barebone, severely abused and downtrodden and named "Credence Barebone". Enraged by people's treatment of him, during the incident of 1926 he set his Obscurus parasite loose in New York City, causing widespread destruction. He survived in a tiny Obscurus fragment and was sought out by Grindelwald. He initially believed that he was Corvus Lestrange, Leta Lestrange's deceased half-brother. However, at the end of the second film, Grindelwald claimed that his real name is Aurelius Dumbledore and that his brother, Albus, would seek to kill him. In the third film, he is identified as being Albus's nephew rather than his brother, as he is actually the illegitimate son of Albus's brother Aberforth.
Dan Fogler as Jacob Kowalski:An American No-Maj veteran of the First World War, owner of a bakery, friend of Newt, and lover of Queenie. When she returns he later marries her and Newt serves as his best man.
Alison Sudol as Queenie Goldstein:The pretty and vivacious renegade younger sister of Tina, who worked alongside her in the Magical Congress of the United States of America (MACUSA). She is a powerful natural Legilimens. After being convinced that Grindelwald will make her dream of marrying Jacob come true, she went rogue and joined his side, eventually abandoning her lover and sister. She later returns to Jacob and they marry at his bakery. Her sister serves as maid of honour.
William Nadylam as Yusuf Kama:A French wizard of Senegalese descent from an old Wizarding family and an ally of Newt, who previously attempted to kill Credence while falsely believing him to be his former stepfather's son, Corvus Lestrange V.
Callum Turner as Theseus Scamander:Newt Scamander's older brother who is a dedicated and loyal Auror, as well as the Head of the Auror Office in the British Ministry of Magic. He is famous for the title "war hero" for his excellent show of bravery and generosity in the First World War. He constantly tries to tame Newt into more elegance so that he is better accepted in society. He lost his fiancée Leta Lestrange in September 1927, after she sacrificed herself in Grindelwald's rally in Pere Lachaise, Paris to save the Scamander brothers.
Jessica Williams as Eulalie "Lally" Hicks:A respected Charms teacher at America's Ilvermorny School of Witchcraft and Wizardry.
Victoria Yeates as Bunty:Newt Scamander's indispensable Magizoology assistant.
Poppy Corby-Tuech as Vinda Rosier:Grindelwald's loyal right-hand follower.
Fiona Glascott as Minerva McGonagall:A teacher at Hogwarts and Albus Dumbledore's colleague.
Katherine Waterston as Tina Goldstein:An American MACUSA Auror and currently Head of the Auror Office in MACUSA. She is Queenie Goldstein's sister and Newt's love interest. She played a role in thwarting Gellert Grindelwald during the Obscurus incident of 1926, for which she and Newt were initially blamed.
Mads Mikkelsen as Gellert Grindelwald:An infamous powerful dark wizard who caused mass violence, terror and chaos around the globe, seeking to lead a new Wizarding World Order based on his strong belief in wizarding superiority. He had a close relationship with Dumbledore as a teenager. Mikkelsen replaces Johnny Depp, who played Grindelwald in the first two films, due to the latter's libel case with News Group Newspapers Ltd. over his alleged domestic abuse of his ex-wife, Amber Heard. The story does not acknowledge or explain the change in Grindelwald's appearance between films, which Mikkelsen described as a "deliberate" choice.

Other cast members include Richard Coyle as Aberforth Dumbledore: Albus Dumbledore's younger brother, owner of the Hog's Head inn, and Credence's biological father; Oliver Masucci as Anton Vogel: The current Supreme Leader of the International Confederation of Wizards (ICW) and Minister of Magic for Germany; Maria Fernanda Cândido as Vicência Santos: Candidate for the post of Supreme Head of the ICW and Minister of Magic for Brazil; and Dave Wong as Liu Tao, Candidate for the post of Supreme Head of the ICW and Minister of Magic for China.

Additionally, Aleksandr Kuznetsov appears as Helmut, an Auror of the German Ministry of Magic, while Valerie Pachner appears as Henrietta Fischer, secretary for the German Ministry of Magic. The minor cast also includes Maja Bloom as Carrow, Paul Low-Hang as Zabini, Ramona Kunze-Libnow as Edith, Matthias Brenner as Otto, Peter Simonischek as Warder, Wilf Scolding as Workman, Jeremy Azis as German Muggle 24, Ramona Kunze-Libnow as Edith, Lucas Englander as Horst, Emilia Karlsson as Ministry Guest, Jan Pohl as Ministry Official, Sean Talo as Ministry Wizard, Jacqueline Boatswain as Ida Webb, Kazeem Tosin Amore as Workman 2, Manuel Klain as Tall Auror, Noor Dillan-Night as Workman, Stefan Race as Karl, David Bertrand as Victor, Jessica Cartledge as Redheaded Ravenclaw, Radha Sthanakiya as Tiny Witch 1, Isabelle Coverdale as Tiny Witch 2, and Dónal Finn as Albert. Hebe Beardsall also briefly reprises her role as Ariana Dumbledore from Harry Potter and the Deathly Hallows – Part 2 (2011) in an uncredited appearance, seen in a magical painting.

Production

Development
In October 2014, Warner Bros. Pictures announced the film as "at least" a trilogy with the third instalment to be released on 20 November 2020. In July 2016, director David Yates confirmed that J. K. Rowling had ideas for the third film's screenplay. In October 2016, it was reported that the Fantastic Beasts film series would comprise five films, and Eddie Redmayne would be returning to all films to play the lead role of Newt Scamander, with producers Rowling, David Heyman, Steve Kloves, and Lionel Wigram. In November 2016, Yates revealed that he would be directing all five films, stating "I love making films, and I've got a great team, all of whom are like family."

In October 2018, Johnny Depp hinted that he might return to portray Gellert Grindelwald for the third film, which would start filming in mid-2019.

On 7 February 2019, it was revealed the film would be set in the 1930s, with the story leading up to the Wizarding World's involvement in World War II and exploring the magical communities in Bhutan, Germany and China in addition to previously established locations including the United States and United Kingdom. In November 2019, Warner Bros. put out a press release announcing the film's location of Brazil, a spring 2020 start of production, and that Steve Kloves, who had previously served as screenwriter on the Harry Potter films, had joined the project as co-writer.

Casting

In March 2020, Jude Law, Johnny Depp, Ezra Miller, Alison Sudol, Dan Fogler, Callum Turner, Katherine Waterston, Claudia Kim and Jessica Williams were revealed to be reprising their roles from previous films, alongside Eddie Redmayne. Kevin Guthrie, who played Abernathy in the first two instalments, was set to return but was fired before production began due to his trial and eventual conviction in a sexual assault case.
In November 2020, Depp announced he would not reprise his role as Grindelwald after being asked by Warner Bros. to resign due to negative publicity resulting from the libel case Depp v News Group Newspapers Ltd. 
Depp shot only three scenes in London, Framestore after production began in September 2020, and his contract stipulated that he be paid regardless of whether the film was completed or not. Depp's salary was reportedly somewhere between $10–16 million. On 25 November, Warner Bros. announced that Mads Mikkelsen would replace Depp in the role of Grindelwald. Mikkelsen opted not to emulate Depp's performance, stating in an interview that it would be "creative suicide", but acknowledged that there still needed to be "some sort of bridge between what came before."

Filming
Principal photography was scheduled to begin on 16 March 2020 but was postponed on that very day due to the COVID-19 pandemic. Filming officially commenced in London on 20 September, with safety precautions in place to keep the cast and crew safe from COVID-19. On 3 February 2021, filming at Warner Bros. Studios, Leavesden in the UK was halted after a crew member tested positive for COVID-19. Composer James Newton Howard confirmed later that month that production had wrapped filming. Although the film is partially set in Berlin and Bhutan, it was not filmed on location. These areas were reimagined and reconstructed on the vast backlot and sound stages of Warner Bros. Studios, Leavesden.

Marketing
The film marketing campaign began in September 2021, the same day the title was announced as Fantastic Beasts: The Secrets of Dumbledore. On 10 December 2021, a sizzle reel promo was released by Warner Bros. Pictures to celebrate the Wizarding World's twentieth anniversary, showing clips from previous films and events of the franchise and ending with a quick teaser for the film, while also announcing that a full trailer would be released the following Monday. The film's official trailer was officially released on 13 December 2021, with a teaser poster being released the following week. On 22 February 2022, 18 posters featuring characters from the film were released online. A second trailer was announced to be released on Thursday, 24 February 2022 by actor Jude Law through the film's social media, but was later delayed. The trailer was eventually released on 28 February, along with the official poster for the film. The official hardcover screenplay was scheduled to be released on 19 July 2022, three months after the film's theatrical release.

Warner Bros spent over $21 million in television advertisement and promotion merchandise, with the film generating over 958 million impressions on airing channels NBC, ABC, TBS, CBS, and SyFy during the March Madness, Winter Olympics, NBA games and other sports and events. The film was one of the many merchandise that includes Warner Bros. Consumer Products's limited edition art prints from MinaLina calling Harry Potter: The Exhibition, Insight Editions' Fantastic Beasts: Secrets of Dumbledore: Movie Magic, Wizarding World's Niffler Figure with 1 card, Hot Topic's casual clothes and t-shirts, LeSportsac's bag and accessories, Build-A-Bear Workshop's character plushy that includes Niffler, Bowtruckle and more, and Funko Pop's action figure out of characters based on the film. Warner's international YouTube channels are getting 125.1 million views from Indonesia, Brazil, Ireland, UK, Spain and more countries, and was one of the strong viral reposting rates with 18:1.

Release

Theatrical
Fantastic Beasts: The Secrets of Dumbledore premiered at the Royal Festival Hall in London on 29 March 2022. It was first released to cinemas in Belgium and the Netherlands on 6 April 2022, followed by other European countries, Australia, China, and Japan through 8 April, the United States and Argentina on 15 April, and the Philippines on 16 April. In the United Arab Emirates, Egypt, Saudi Arabia, Qatar, Bahrain, Kuwait, and Lebanon, the film was released on 28 April 2022. The Secrets of Dumbledore was made available to stream on HBO Max on 30 May 2022.

The film was initially scheduled to be released on 12 November 2021, but following Depp's departure, his role's recasting with Mikkelsen and the COVID-19 pandemic, Warner Bros. shifted the release to 15 July 2022. In September 2021, the film's release was pushed forward three months early to 15 April 2022. It was later announced that the film would be released a week earlier in the United Kingdom and Ireland on 8 April 2022.

Home media
Fantastic Beasts: The Secrets of Dumbledore was released for digital download on 30 May 2022, and on Ultra HD Blu-ray, Blu-ray and DVD on 28 June 2022. Over its first month of streaming in HBO Max, the film was streamed in an estimated eight million households.

Reception

Box office
Fantastic Beasts: The Secrets of Dumbledore grossed $95.9 million in the United States and Canada, and $311.1 million in other territories, for a worldwide total of $407 million.

In the United States and Canada, Fantastic Beasts: The Secrets of Dumbledore was projected to gross around $40 million from 4,200 theatres in its opening weekend. The film made $20 million on its first day, including $6 million on the Thursday night previews. It went on to debut to $42.2 million, topping the box office but marking the lowest opening of the Wizarding World franchise. Women over 25 (38%) were the largest demographic, followed by men over 25 (33%). The film grossed $14 million in its second weekend, dropping 67% and finishing in third place, marking the second-worst second weekend drop for the Wizarding World franchise after Harry Potter and the Deathly Hallows – Part 2 saw a 72% second weekend drop in 2011.

Outside the U.S. and Canada, the film earned $56.9 million from 22 international markets in its opening weekend. In Germany, the film's $9.2 million debut was the best opening for Warner Bros. since 2019's Joker. The film made $71.7 million in its second weekend. This included openings of $7.1 million in both France and Mexico, the latter of which was the second-biggest opening for Warner Bros. during the pandemic. It added $38.3 million in its third international weekend, crossing the $200 million worldwide mark. It crossed the $300 million mark in its fourth weekend.

Critical response

On review aggregator Rotten Tomatoes, the film has an approval rating of 46% based on 234 reviews, with an average rating of 5.4/10. The website's critics consensus states: "Fantastic Beasts: The Secrets of Dumbledore avoids some of the pitfalls that plagued its predecessor, but lacks much of the magic that drew audiences into the Wizarding World many movies ago." Metacritic assigned the film a weighted average score of 47 out of 100 based on 49 critics, indicating "mixed or average reviews" and marking the lowest score on the site for a Wizarding World film. Audiences polled by CinemaScore gave the film an average grade of "B+" on an A+ to F scale, tied for the lowest of the franchise with The Crimes of Grindelwald, while those at PostTrak gave it an 81% positive score, with 63% saying they would definitely recommend it.

A particular focus of praise from some reviews was that Mads Mikkelsen outperformed Johnny Depp in the role of Grindelwald.

Accolades 
The film was nominated for Best Fantasy Film at the 47th Saturn Awards and for two awards including Outstanding Visual Effects in a Photoreal Feature at the 21st Visual Effects Society Awards.

Future
The Fantastic Beasts film series was initially speculated to be a trilogy, but in October 2016, Rowling announced that the series would be composed of five films, later confirming that the story of the series would consist of a sequence of events that occurred between the years of 1926 and 1945. In February 2022, producer David Heyman revealed that work on the script for Fantastic Beasts 4 had not begun yet.  In April 2022, Variety reported that Warner Bros. greenlighting the final two instalments would be dependent on the critical and commercial performance of The Secrets of Dumbledore. Mads Mikkelsen believed that Johnny Depp could return as Grindelwald in another film.

In November 2022, it was reported that Warner Bros. Discovery was not actively planning to continue the film series or to develop any films related to the Wizarding World franchise.

References

External links
 
 
 

2020s English-language films
2020s American films
2022 adventure films
2022 fantasy films
2022 films
4DX films
American fantasy adventure films
American sequel films
British fantasy adventure films
British sequel films
Casting controversies in film
Fantastic Beasts films
Film productions suspended due to the COVID-19 pandemic
Film spin-offs
Films about elections
Films about legendary creatures
Films about phoenixes
Films about precognition
Films based on works by J. K. Rowling
Films directed by David Yates
Films postponed due to the COVID-19 pandemic
Films produced by David Heyman
Films produced by J. K. Rowling
Films produced by Steve Kloves
Films scored by James Newton Howard
Films set in 1932
Films set in Austria
Films set in Berlin
Films set in Bhutan
Films set in Guangxi
Films set in London
British films set in New York City
Films set in Scotland
Films shot at Warner Bros. Studios, Leavesden
Films shot in London
Films shot in Hertfordshire
Films with screenplays by J. K. Rowling
Films with screenplays by Steve Kloves
Heyday Films films
High fantasy films
IMAX films
Interquel films
Prequel films
ScreenX films
Warner Bros. films
2020s British films
American prequel films
British prequel films